The Del-Vikings (also known as The Dell-Vikings) were an American doo-wop musical group that recorded several hit singles in the 1950s and continued to record and tour with various lineups in later decades. The group is notable for the hit songs "Come Go with Me" and "Whispering Bells", and for having been a successful racially mixed musical group during a period of time when such groups were rare.

History

Formation and early fame
The Del-Vikings were formed in 1955 by members of the United States Air Force stationed in Pittsburgh, Pennsylvania, with Clarence Quick, Kripp Johnson, Don Jackson, Samuel Paterson, Bernard Robertson and guitarist Joe Lopes. Because all of the members were in the armed forces, the group constantly ran the risk of being disrupted by members being stationed in other places. This happened soon after the group's forming when Paterson and Robertson were sent to Germany. They were replaced by baritone David Lerchey, the group's first white member, and tenor Norman Wright. Wright had started a group with Lawrence "Prince" Lloyd called The Valverteens from Amarillo Air Force Base, Texas, before joining The Del-Vikings. 
Shortly after, Don Jackson left the band and was replaced by Gus Backus, the group's second white member.

The band's name was created by Clarence Quick. Some sources say that  band members had read about Vikings with the prefix "Del" being "added to give the group name an air of mystery." Another suggestion is that Clarence Quick had known of a basketball team in Brooklyn, New York, called the Vikings and had suggested the name. The name may also have originated from the popular Viking Press, publisher of paperbacks that group members liked to read.

Their first hit came in 1957 with "Come Go with Me", released on Fee Bee Records as catalog number FB-205. In late January 1957, Dot Records re-released "Come Go With Me" as Dot 45-15538. The song was written by Clarence Quick.  The song became a hit, peaking at #5 on the Billboard Best Sellers chart. It sold over one million copies and was awarded a gold disc. The song was later featured in the films American Graffiti (1973), Diner (1982), Stand by Me (1986), Joe Versus the Volcano (1990), and Set It Up (2018). Rolling Stone listed "Come Go With Me" as no. 449 on its list of the 500 Greatest Songs of All Time.

Split

All of the group members, other than Kripp Johnson, were under 21 when they signed their recording contract with Fee Bee (a tiny Pittsburgh label, which was later distributed by Dot Records). Having signed the contract as minors, they had the right to be released from it. In 1957, under the direction of their manager, Alan Strauss, they left to record at Mercury Records. Johnson, who was still bound to Fee Bee/Dot, stayed, thus creating two Del-Vikings groups. The original group replaced Johnson with Quick's friend William Blakely and recorded the Backus-led song "Cool Shake". Kripp Johnson constructed a new group with the returning Don Jackson, Chuck Jackson, Arthur Budd, and Ed Everette. This group recorded the Kripp Johnson-led "I'm Spinning", billing themselves as the Dell-Vikings.

The Dell-Vikings also released "Whispering Bells" in May of 1957, with Kripp Johnson singing lead vocals. (The Dot label referred to Johnson as "Krips Johnson".) "Whispering Bells" reached No. 5 on the U.S. R&B chart and #9 on the U.S. pop chart in 1957. "Whispering Bells" was featured in the 1986 film Stand by Me and was included in the film's soundtrack. Johnson also sang lead vocals on the B-side "Don't Be A Fool".

Around this time, some old Fee Bee demo tracks had been sold to an up-and-coming record company, Luniverse, who overdubbed a backing track on these a capella songs, which included an early version of "Come Go with Me". The overdubbed demo was included as a track on an eight-song album subsequently released by Luniverse. Only one single was released from these Luniverse overdubs—"Somewhere Over The Rainbow"/ "Hey Senorita".

Johnson's Dot group had an extra advantage—he had been discharged from the USAF and his group could tour freely, while the original group needed to seek military leave in order to tour. Mercury sued, claiming it had sole rights to any spelling of the group's name, and the Dell-Vikings briefly became The Versatiles, with singles being billed to "Kripp Johnson and the Versatiles" or "Chuck Jackson and the Versatiles". The group broke up, with Chuck Jackson going on to a successful solo career. Meanwhile, the original group had begun to fall apart. Gus Backus was re-stationed, leaving the group a quartet. They broke up soon after. Quick restructured the group with new talent from the Pittsburgh area—lead tenor, Billy G. Woodruff, Willie Green, Horace Douglas "Doug" White, and Ritzy Lee. By the end of 1957, with the breakup of the Dell-Vikings, Kripp Johnson returned to the original group, making them a sextet. They signed to ABC Records (ABC-Paramount). While the nucleus of the group was back, they weren't able to chart any more hits, and the group split up in 1965.

Reunion and split
The Del-Vikings were back in 1970 with a near original line-up of Clarence Quick, Kripp Johnson, Norman Wright, David Lerchey, and William Blakely. The group re-recorded their old hit for Scepter Records; a new version of "Come Go With Me" made the Bubbling Under The Hot 100 chart in 1973 (it also wound up on the Easy Listening chart, where it peaked that year at #32).

They performed Come Go With Me On April 27th, 1973(For The Midnight Special TV Show).The line-up was Billy G. Woodruff, Roalf "Ritzy" Lee, Kripp Johnson, Clarence Quick, and Terry Young.

Norman Wright, David Lerchey, and Wright's two sons, Norman Wright, Jr. and Anthony Wright performed as The Del Vikings for PBS show "Doo Wop 50" in 2000, and Wright toured and performed with his sons for the remainder of his life.

Clarence Quick died May 5th, 1983.

Corinthian "Kripp" Johnson died of cancer on June 22, 1990 at age 57.

Gus Backus died in Germany on February 21, 2019.

David Lerchey (born in New Albany, Indiana) died of cancer on January 29, 2005 in Hallandale, Florida, at age 67.

Norman Wright died after a long illness on April 23, 2010, at age 72.

Roalf E. "Ritzy" Lee died On June 27th, 2020.

Singles discography

See also
Del Vikings (France), an antifascist black youth subculture with a love for American classic cars, doo wop, and early rock & roll

References

External links
 Marv Goldberg's article on The Del Vikings
 The Del Vikings - 1957 - Complete Recordings
 [ The Del Vikings biography at allmusic.com]
 Listen to "Rock and Roll Remembered"
 History of Rock article

1955 establishments in Pennsylvania
1965 disestablishments in Pennsylvania
Doo-wop groups
Musical groups from Pittsburgh
Mercury Records artists
American rhythm and blues musicians
Musical groups established in 1955
Musical groups disestablished in 1965